Up is the fifth studio album by English pop band ABC, released in October 1989. This time experimenting with house music, it was ABC's first album not to make the top 40 in the UK. However, they scored a minor UK hit with the single "One Better World", an ode to love, peace and tolerance. "The Real Thing" was also released as a single. Up was the band's final album released on the PolyGram label.

In 2005, a digitally remastered CD of the album was released with five bonus tracks.

Track listing

Personnel 
ABC
 Martin Fry – vocals
 Mark White – keyboards, programming

Additional personnel
 Dave Clayton – keyboards 
 Ritchie Close – keyboards
 Mike Pickering – keyboards, programming and DJ (9) 
 Rob Dean – guitars
 Maurice Michael – guitars, backing vocals 
 Danny Cummings – drums, percussion
 David Palmer – drums, percussion
 Phil Smith – saxophones
 Graeme Park – DJ (9)
 Alan Carvell – backing vocals 
 Lorenza Johnson – backing vocals

Production 
 Producers – Martin Fry and Mark White
 Additional production on tracks 3 & 9 – Blaze 
 Engineers – Mark Stent (tracks 1 & 3–11); Bob Kraushaar (track 2).
 Assistant engineer – Tim Burrell
 Mixing – Bob Kraushaar (tracks 1, 2 & 4–8); Julian Mendelsohn (track 3).
 Remix – Graeme Park and Mike Pickering (track 9); Bob Kraushaar (tracks 10 & 11).
 Mixed at Marcus Studios and Sarm West Studios (London, UK).
 Mastered by Ian Cooper at Townhouse Studios (London, UK).
 Sleeve design – ABC and Design KB
 Photography – Paul Cox
 Management – Bennett Freed

Chart performance

Weekly charts

References

External links

1989 albums
ABC (band) albums
Mercury Records albums